Sweet T is the debut studio album by American drag queen and singer Ginger Minj, released on October 21, 2016. The album features cover versions and original music.

Promotion
The album was preceded by the singles "Ooh Lala Lala" and "Bad, Bad Boy". Ginger Minj performed the song "Dream a Little Dream" on the first episode of RuPaul's Drag Race All Stars season 2.

Track listing

References 

2016 debut albums
Producer Entertainment Group albums